Boomerang is a Portuguese pay television channel which launched on 21 April 2015, and is owned by Warner Bros. Discovery under its International division. Currently, it is available in Angola, Mozambique and Portugal.

History

As Boomerang (2015–2023) 

On 5 June 2005, Boomerang Europe was launched in English for all Europe, Middle East and Africa, including Portugal, Angola and Mozambique. On 31 December 2013, the Pan-European feed was removed in Portugal due to the launch of the Portuguese feed of Cartoon Network. On 21 April 2015, Boomerang in European Portuguese was launched in Angola and Mozambique as a partnership with DStv and it is available on the DStv Bué and DStv Grande packages. Later, it was launched in Portugal on 26 April 2018 and it is available with Vodafone and Nowo TV operators. The channel also became avalible on Meo on 2021.

As Cartoonito (2023–present) 
On February 21, 2022, a morning and afternoon Cartoonito block launched on Boomerang. Like other international versions of the channel, Boomerang in Portugal will become a full-time Cartoonito channel on March 23, 2023.

Programming

Original programming

 The Tom and Jerry Show (25 April 2015)
 Tom and Jerry in New York
 Baby Looney Tunes
 Batwheels

Acquired programming 
 Mr. Bean: The Animated Series (25 April 2015)
 Grizzy and the Lemmings (4 September 2016)
 Alice & Lewis
 Cocomelon
 Lucas the Spider
 Moley
 Mighty Mike
 Mush-Mush and The Mushables
 Pat the Dog

See also

 Hanna-Barbera
 Turner Entertainment
 Warner Bros. Animation

References

External links
 

Cartoonito
Boomerang (TV network)
2015 establishments in Portugal
Television stations in Portugal
Television channels and stations established in 2015
Turner Broadcasting System Europe
Turner Broadcasting System Portugal
Warner Bros. Discovery EMEA